The Illinois General Assembly, the legislature of the U.S. state of Illinois, has convened many times since statehood became effective on December 3, 1818.

Legislatures

See also
 List of governors of Illinois
 List of Illinois secretaries of state
 History of Illinois

References

External links
 , 1861-
 

Legislatures
Legislature
 
Illinois
Illinois